Volker Buhren is a German lightweight rower. He won a gold medal at the 1975 World Rowing Championships in Nottingham with the lightweight men's eight.

References

Year of birth missing (living people)
West German male rowers
World Rowing Championships medalists for West Germany
Living people